HMS Fowey was a fifth rate warship of the Royal Navy, launched on 14 August 1744 in Hull, England.  She spent only four years in commission before she struck a reef and sank in what is known today as Legare Anchorage in Biscayne National Park, off the coast of Florida.  She was armed with six, nine, and eighteen pounder guns and crewed with over 200 men.

History

She was initially built to carry 20 guns, and was commanded from her commissioning until 1747 by Captain Policarpus Taylor, who would later rise to the rank of rear admiral. Fowey was first active in the English Channel and the waters off Gibraltar. In 1745, she was rearmed to carry 44 guns, and later that year engaged the French ship Griffon, which was wrecked in the ensuing battle.

Later, in 1746 Fowey escorted troop transports to the recently captured Fortress of Louisbourg on Cape Breton in Nova Scotia.  For most of her career Fowey was assigned to a split duty station cruising the coast of North America from South Carolina to Boston during the summer and operating out of Port Antonio, Jamaica and the Caribbean in the winter.  On 2 November 1747 Policarpus Taylor was reassigned to HMS Warwick, and was replaced by Captain Francis William Drake.

In June 1748, Fowey captured a Spanish ship, the St. Juan y Tadicos.  While escorting this prize and two British colonial merchant vessels to her summer duty station off Virginia, Fowey ran onto a reef and sank on 26 June.  The English crew crowded onto the merchant vessels and navigated the hostile waters of Spanish Florida to Charleston.  The crew of the St. Juan were given their parole and sailed for Havana.

Discovery and Litigation
Two hundred and twenty-seven years would pass before the remains of the Fowey would be identified in 1975 by archaeologist George Fischer of the National Park Service. For many years, those searching for the wreck site had been distracted by the named obstacle, Fowey Rocks, which lie some distance to the north. However, from work commenced in the United Kingdom, by Major Paul Payne, who held an artefact from the original crew, navigational data became available, from which Mr Fischer narrowed the search.   Four years later in 1979 a sport diver from Miami requested title in Admiralty Court to a "wrecked and abandoned sailing vessel with Legare Anchorage in Biscayne National Park."  At this time the Abandoned Shipwreck Act was a decade in the future. The United States intervened in the lawsuit as the defendant seeking title, arguing that the shipwreck was public property in a National Park and, as such should be preserved as a part of the Nation's patrimony.  In 1983, the United States won the case.  The court decision constituted a landmark in United States historic shipwreck preservation case law.  It stated that the remains of HMS Fowey were an archaeological site, not a ship in terms of Admiralty salvage; that the site was in no peril and did not need rescuing by the salvor; and that the site is public property and a part of the United States' heritage which ought to be managed in the best interests of the public rather than privately salvaged and sold for profit.

Study
In the twenty five years since the wreck was identified, HMS Fowey has been broadly studied in the surviving documentary records of the United States, Canada, and Great Britain and has been the subject of three National Park Service field projects.  The largest and best documented of these was conducted in 1983.  Evidence of the wreck's function as a Royal Naval vessel include iron ballast blocks and guns, and copper gunpowder barrel hoops marked with the Broad Arrow denoting ownership by the crown.  Its cultural affiliation is further denoted by the presence of English-made pewter, glass, and ceramic tablewares.

References

Skowronek, Russell K. 2002. HMS Fowey.  Encyclopedia of Historical Archaeology, Charles E. Orser, editor.  Routledge, London.
A history of HMS Fowey.

Further reading
Binkley, Cameron (2007) Science, Politics, and the 'Big Dig': a History of the Southeast Archeological Center and the Development of Cultural Resources Management in the Southeast. Cultural Resources Division, Southeast Regional Office, National Park Service, Atlanta, GA.
Skowronek, Russell K. and George R. Fischer (2009) HMS Fowey Lost and Found: Being the Discovery, Excavation, and Identification of a British Man-of-War Lost off the Cape of Florida in 1748.  University Press of Florida, Gainesville.
Skowronek, R.K., R. E. Johnson, R. H. Vernon and G. R. Fischer (1987) The Legare Anchorage Shipwreck Site-Grave of HMS Fowey.  International Journal of Nautical Archaeology 16(4):313-324.
May, W.E. (1958) The Wreck of HMS Fowey.  Mariner's Mirror 44(1):320-324.
Skowronek, R.K. (1984) Archaeological Testing and Evaluation of the Legare Anchorage Shipwreck Site, Biscayne National Park, Summer 1983.  Southeast Archeological Center, National Park Service, Tallahassee, FL.
Skowronek, R.K. (1985) Sport Divers and Archaeology: The Case of the Legare Anchorage Ship Site. Archaeology Magazine 38(3):22-27.
Skowronek, R.K. (1997) Hurricane Uncovers 18th-Century Wreck. Naval History 11(1):14.
Lowerre, Cornelia Louisa Keane (2014) A Submerged Cultural Resources Site Report:  HMS Fowey.  A Thesis  https://scholarship.miami.edu/esploro/outputs/graduate/A-Submerged-Cultural-Resources-Site-Report-HMS-Fowey/991031447850602976

External links
 The Excavation of HMS Fowey

Frigates of the Royal Navy
Shipwrecks of the Florida Keys
1744 in military history
1744 ships
Maritime incidents in 1748
Ships built on the Humber